The Waimea by-election 1858 was a by-election held in the multi-member  electorate during the 2nd New Zealand Parliament, on 21 May 1858.

The by-election was caused by the resignation of incumbent MP Charles Elliott on 20 March 1858.

The by-election was won unopposed by David Monro, who had represented the seat in the previous parliament.

References

Waimea 1858
1858 elections in New Zealand
May 1858 events
Politics of the Nelson Region